This is a list of television channels that broadcast for a Swedish language audience.

Channels holding a broadcasting license for the terrestrial network are marked "(DTT)."

Public non-commercial networks

SVT
SVT1 (News) (DTT)
SVT2 (general) (DTT)
SVT24 (news, sports, reruns) (DTT)
SVT Barn (children) (DTT)
Kunskapskanalen (educational) (DTT)

The public television channels are mostly funded by a license fee and broadcast free-to-air.

SVT has 21 local news districts.

Swedish private commercial networks
These are privately owned television channels that are solely, or almost solely, directed at Sweden. Many such channels don't broadcast from Sweden, but nevertheless target a Swedish audience.

TV4 is the only commercial channel ever to have broadcast nationally in the Swedish analogue terrestrial network, but the arrival of digital terrestrial television saw the TV4 monopoly on commercial television broken.

TV4 AB
TV4 (general entertainment) (DTT) (HD)
Sjuan (general entertainment) (DTT)
TV12 (DTT) (HD)
TV4 Film (movies) (DTT)
TV4 Fakta (documentaries) (DTT)
TV4 Guld ("classic" programming)
C More Sport (sports) (DTT)

Viaplay Group
TV3 (general entertainment) (DTT) (HD)
TV6 (entertainment) (DTT) (HD)
TV8 (news and documentaries) (DTT)
TV10 (sport and documentaries) (DTT)
V Sport 1 (HD)
V Sport Football (HD)
V Sport Hockey

Warner Bros. Discovery Nordic
Kanal 5 (entertainment) (DTT) (HD)
Kanal 9 (entertainment) (DTT) (HD)
Kanal 11 (entertainment, formerly TV400) (DTT)
Discovery Channel Sweden (documentaries) (DTT)
TLC Sweden (lifestyle) (DTT)

Paramount Networks EMEAA
MTV Europe (music/entertainment) (DTT)
MTV 00s (DTT)
Nickelodeon Sweden (children) (DTT)
Nick Jr. (DTT)
Nicktoons (DTT)

Other
Axess TV (culture and information) - owned by Axel och Margaret Ax:son Johnsons stiftelse för allmännyttiga ändamål (DTT)
Fox (DTT) (HD)

Regional terrestrial channels:
Kanal 12 (DTT)

Pan-Nordic channels
These channels mostly target the Nordic countries. Most channels carry subtitles and/or audio in Swedish.

Viaplay Group
V Film Premiere (movies) (HD)
V Film Action (HD) - previously known as Cinema
V Film Hits (HD)
V Film Family (HD)
V Series (HD)
V Sport Golf (HD)
V Sport Hockey (HD)
V Sport Live
V Sport Motor (HD)
V Sport Ultra (HD)

Viasat World 

 Viasat History (documentaries) (HD)
 Viasat Nature (documentaries) (HD)
 Viasat Explore (documentaries) (HD)

TV4 Group
C More First (HD) (movies) (DTT, HD partial)
C More Hits (HD) (DTT, partial)
C More Stars
C More Series (HD)
Sport Kanalen
C More Golf
C More Fotboll (DTT, partial) (HD)
C More Hockey (DTT, partial)
C More Live (DTT, partial)
C More Live 2
C More Live 3
C More Live 4
C More Live 5
SF-kanalen

Warner Bros. Discovery Europe
Animal Planet HD, Swedish subtitles
Animal Planet Nordic, Swedish subtitles (DTT)
Boomerang (Nordic), Swedish audio
Cartoon Network Nordic, Swedish audio (DTT, partial)
Eurosport 1, Swedish audio (DTT)
Eurosport 2, Swedish audio (DTT)

BBC Studios
BBC Brit Scandinavia, Swedish subtitles
BBC Earth Scandinavia, Swedish subtitles

Others
CNBC Nordic
Hope Channel Sverige (religious)
National Geographic Channel HD Scandinavia, Swedish subtitles
National Geographic Channel Scandinavia, Swedish subtitles (DTT)
History Channel HD Scandinavia, Swedish subtitles
History Channel Scandinavia, Swedish subtitles
LifeStyle TV (religious)
TV Shop Europe (home shopping)
Tvins.com (home shopping)

Pan-European channels 
These are channels targeting all of Europe. This section may include virtually all channels available from any satellite that can be received in Sweden, but this list mostly concerns encrypted channels that are available from Swedish satellite distributors. Some have Swedish subtitles.

3ABN International
Al Jazeera English (DTT)
BBC World News (DTT)
Bloomberg TV Europe
Blue Hustler
CBS Reality, Swedish subtitles
Chelsea TV
CNN International (DTT)
Deutsche Welle
Discovery HD Showcase, Swedish subtitles
Discovery Science Europe, Swedish subtitles (DTT)
Discovery Travel & Living Europe, Swedish subtitles (DTT)
Discovery World Europe, Swedish subtitles
E!, Swedish subtitles
ESPN Classic Sports Europe
EuroNews
Eurosport HD
Extreme Sports Channel
Fashion TV
France 24
Fuel TV
Ginx
GOD TV
Hope Channel International
Horse & Country
Hustler TV
Investigation Discovery
Mezzo
Mezzo Live HD
Motors TV
MTV 80s
MTV 90s
MTV 00s (DTT, partial)
Club MTV
MTV Hits
MTV Live
MUTV
Nat Geo Wild (HD)
Nautical Channel
Outdoor Channel
OutTV
Playboy TV
RT
Rush HD
SABC News International
Sky News
Spice Platinum
Trace Urban HD
Travel Channel Europe, Swedish subtitles (HD)
TV5Monde

Public access stations 
Jönköpings lokal-TV - Jönköping Municipality
Steve - Lund Municipality
TV Malmö - Malmö Municipality
Öppna Kanalen Göteborg - Gothenburg Municipality
Öppna Kanalen Skövde- Skövde Municipality
Öppna Kanalen Stockholm - Stockholm Municipality
Lokal-TV Uddevalla - Uddevalla Municipality & Lysekil Municipality

Cable operators with more than 100 households are required by law to carry extra space for a local cable channel.

The Majority of "Open Channel" Public Access stations in Sweden are part of the national organisation RÖK.

Defunct channels
BBC HD Scandinavia (2008–2016)
BBC Lifestyle Scandinavia (2007–2016)
Big TV (2006)
Comedy Central Sweden (2009–2019)
Discovery Mix (2002–2007)
DiTV (2005–2008)
Fan TV
Filmmax (–1995)
Hallmark Channel (2000–2009)
Jetix (1998–2009)
Kanal Lokal Göteborg (2005–2009)
Kanal Lokal Skåne (2005–2009)
Kanal Lokal Stockholm (2005–2009)
Kanal Lokal Östergötland (1995–2009)
Med i tv (2001–2005)
MTV Rocks (2014–2020)
ONE Television (2006–2007)
Paramount Network (2019–2022)
SF Succé
Showtime Scandinavia (2004–2015)
Silver (2006–2015)
Sportkanalen
SuperSport
Star! Scandinavia (2000–2015)
SVT HD (2006–2010)
Toon Disney (2005–2009)
TV Plus
TV1000 Cinema (1995–2004)
TV21 (1993–2000)
TVG (1994–1997)
TV6 (1994–1998/2002)
TCM Nordic (1993–2017)
The Voice TV Sweden (2004–2008)
TNT (2006–2019)
VH1 (2001–2021)
VH1 Classic (2004–2020)
ZTV (1992–2010)

Distributors
Television packages and distributors in Sweden:

Digital terrestrial:
Boxer
Satellite:
Canal Digital
Viasat
Cable:
Com Hem
Canal Digital
Tele2Vision
Various local cable distributors
AB Sappa
IPTV
Telia Digital-tv
FastTV (Disbanded in May 2010)
Bredbandsbolaget
Canal Digital
IP Sweden
AB Sappa

See also 
 Television in Sweden
 Lists of television channels
 List of European television stations

External links 
AB Sappa - cable and IPTV television distributor
tvprogram.nu - timetables
tv.nu - Timetables
DagensTV.com - "Today's TV"
Radiotjänst - license fee collector for public service television
Teracom - terrestrial broadcast operator
Boxer - terrestrial digital broadcast distributor
Canal Digital cable and satellite television distributor
Com Hem - cable television distributor
Tele2Vision - cable television distributor
Viasat - satellite television distributor

Sweden
 
Stations